An election to Llanelli Borough Council was held in May 1976. It was preceded by the 1973 election and followed by the 1979 election. On the same day there were elections to the other local authorities and community councils in Wales.

Results

Llanelli Borough Ward One (three seats)

 

Michael Willis Gimblett, served as mayor and leader of the Llanelli borough council during 1976. As the liberal candidate for the Llanelli parliamentary seat in 1974, he is known to be the only liberal candidate during that general election to increase the liberal percentage of the vote, whilst all other liberal vote percentages across all other constituencies in the country decreased.

Llanelli Borough Ward Two (three seats)

Llanelli Borough Ward Three (three seats)

Llanelli Borough Ward Four (three seats)

Llanelli Borough Ward Five (three seats)

Llanelli Borough Ward Six (three seats)

Llanelli Borough Ward Seven (three seats)

Llanelli Borough Ward Eight (three seats)

Llanelli Borough Ward Nine (three seats)

Llanelli Borough Ward Ten (three seats)

Llanelli Borough Ward Eleven (three seats)

References

1976
1976 Welsh local elections
May 1976 events in the United Kingdom